Luis Peña Ganchegui (Oñati, Guipúzcoa, 29 March 1926 - San Sebastián, 2 April 2009) was a Spanish architect. He is considered one of the first to introduce contemporary architecture to Spain.

Biography 
He studied architecture at the Superior Technical School of Architecture of Madrid, graduating in 1959. He began teaching in the same year, first in Barcelona and then in San Sebastian, where he was professor beginning in 1982 and deputy director starting in 1983.

Political activity 
In 1956, Luis Peña became associated with the University Socialist Group  (Spanish Wikipedia link) which was led in those years by Víctor Pradera, among others. He was detained for related activities in Pamplona in mid-March 1956, as part of a group that included Juan Benet and Luis Martín-Santos.

Career 
Of his numerous projects, many of the most notable are in the Basque country. His best-known work is the Comb of the Wind, a collaboration with Eduardo Chillida. The two also collaborated on the Plaza de los Fueros in Vitoria. The Hotel Amara Plaza, in San Sebastián was designed by Luis Peña Ganchegi. One of his last works was the reform of the Square of Pasai San Juan.

Awards 
1999: Antonio Camuñas Architecture Prize, awarded for his professional career.

2004: Gold Medal of Architecture, granted by the Superior Council of the Colleges of Architects of Spain.

2007: COAVN Architecture Award for Best Urban Design and Landscaping.

References

External links 
 Luis Peña Ganchegi in Wikimedia Commons
 Luis Peña Ganchegi arquitectura
 Obras de Luis Peña Ganchegui en Urbipedia

People from Oñati
20th-century Spanish architects
1926 births
2009 deaths
Spanish socialists
Architects from the Basque Country (autonomous community)